The United States District Court for the Northern District of Florida (in case citations, N.D. Fla.) is a federal court in the Eleventh Circuit (except for patent claims and claims against the U.S. government under the Tucker Act, which are appealed to the Federal Circuit).

The District was established on February 23, 1847, with the division of the state into a Northern and Southern district.

 the United States Attorney for the District is Jason R. Coody.

Organization of the court 
The United States District Court for the Northern District of Florida is one of three federal judicial districts in Florida. Court for the District is held at Gainesville, Panama City, Pensacola, and Tallahassee. The court serves approximately 1.75 million people.

Gainesville Division comprises the following counties: Alachua, Dixie, Gilchrist, Lafayette, and Levy.

Panama City Division comprises the following counties: Bay, Calhoun, Gulf, Holmes, Jackson, and Washington.

Pensacola Division comprises the following counties: Escambia, Okaloosa, Santa Rosa, and Walton.

Tallahassee Division comprises the following counties: Franklin, Gadsden, Jefferson, Leon, Liberty, Madison, Taylor, and Wakulla.

Current judges 
:

Former judges

Chief judges

Succession of seats

See also 
 Courts of Florida
 List of current United States district judges
 List of United States federal courthouses in Florida
 United States Court of Appeals for the Eleventh Circuit
 United States District Court for the Middle District of Florida
 United States District Court for the Southern District of Florida

References

External links 
 Official website
 Meet the U.S. Attorney, Justice.gov

Florida, Northern
Florida law
Gainesville, Florida
Panama City, Florida
Pensacola, Florida
Tallahassee, Florida
1847 establishments in Florida
Courthouses in Florida
Courts and tribunals established in 1847